Nusantara TV (abbrievated as NTV) is an Indonesian digital terrestrial television network based in Central Jakarta, owned by NT Corp.

History
NTV is owned by PT Nusantara Media Mandiri, one of business units of NT Corp, that engage in digital television broadcasting media with national coverage and has the status of private broadcasting institution. Nusantara TV and its logo has granted a trademark certificate from Ministry of Law and Human Rights of Republic of Indonesia, based on Act No.20 of 2016, with registration number IDM000806608 regarding trademarks since .

Programs
 Buletin Berita (News Bulletin)
 Apa Kata Dunia (What The World Said)
 Perempuan Kita (Our Women)
 Update-in
 Arena Olahraga (Sports Arena)
 Local’s Talk
 Telisik Hukum (Unveil The Law)
 Bincang Virtual (Virtual Talks)
 Cinepedia
 Cinekids

Presenters
 Tasya Felder
 Muhammad Irsal
 Adi Wiranata
 Muhammad Irsal
 Okie Achmad Zainufry
 Indah Warsetio
 Stephan Tambunan (Previously as Program Announcement on RCTI year 2003)

Broadcasting networks

See also
 List of television stations in Indonesia

References

External links 
  

Television networks in Indonesia